Chim-Hing Stephanie Chan (born 30 July 1957) is a Canadian para table tennis player who has won four medals in three Parapan American Games. She contracted polio at the age of four but began playing table tennis at the age of 44. She was the first female Canadian table tennis player to compete in the Paralympic Games in 2016.

References

External links
 
 

1957 births
Living people
Canadian female table tennis players
Paralympic table tennis players of Canada
Table tennis players at the 2016 Summer Paralympics
Medalists at the 2007 Parapan American Games
Medalists at the 2011 Parapan American Games
Medalists at the 2015 Parapan American Games
Medalists at the 2019 Parapan American Games
People from Richmond, British Columbia
Naturalised table tennis players